WVNR (1340 AM) is a radio station licensed to serve Poultney, Vermont. The station is owned by Loud Media. It airs a classic country music format. WVNR and its FM counterpart 94.1 WNYV in Whitehall, New York, are simulcast 100% of the time.

There is more information about WVNR on the WNYV page.

The station signed on with the WVNR call letters by authority of the Federal Communications Commission and have been in use since February 5, 1981.

On May 5, 2020, it was announced the station had been sold to Loud Media.

On July 25, 2020, Loud Media rebranded the station as "K94.1" playing classic country. The new format and branding replicates its sister station K96.9 KYAP.

See also
 WNYV

References

External links
WVNR official website

VNR
Classic country radio stations in the United States
Radio stations established in 1981
1981 establishments in Vermont